Lucas Allen Hunt (born November 2, 1976, Davenport, Iowa) is an American poet.

HUNT grew up in a Grant Wood Iowa landscape of baseball parks, barnyard barbecues, and Lutheran Sunday school. The son of an oil well driller, Hunt dropped out of college and wandered the United States, Mexico, and Europe. In Paris, he lived in an apartment above Shakespeare & Company Bookstore. In Wales, he studied at Swansea University. Along his journey, he worked on a pig farm, washed semi-trailer trucks, bartended at an American Legion Hall, and served as a park ranger.

He studied psychology and journalism at The University of Iowa, and attended the Iowa Writer's Workshop. While there, he worked as a police beat reporter for a newspaper. He studied in the MFA program at Southampton College  on Long Island. His debut collection of poetry, Lives (2006, Vagabond Press)  was published.

HUNT has published work in The New York Times, East Hampton Star, and received a John Steinbeck Award for poetry.  His second book of poetry, Light on the Concrete (2011, North Sea Press), was praised by The Literate Man Review for "its treatment of every day subjects, which HUNT's precise and beautiful language infuses with feeling that we all recognize and share." He is the author of IOWA (2016) and HAMPTONS (2019), the first two volumes of a five-book series about places of inspiration in the epic style. The next volume is NEW YORK (2020), followed by PARIS and ROME.

He is the former Director of a Manhattan based literary agency. Prior to that, HUNT served as Rights Manager for the Philip G. Spitzer Literary Agency, where he worked with best-selling authors Michael Connelly, James Lee Burke, Andre Dubus III, and Simon Van Booy. HUNT closed major print, audio, digital and foreign language deals. He went on to found an independent poetry publisher.

He is a former resident of Springs, New York, currently lives in Long Island City, Queens, and serves on the board for The Poetry Society of New York.

Publications

References

1976 births
Living people
American male poets
Writers from Davenport, Iowa
Southampton College alumni
People from East Hampton (town), New York
People from Davenport, Iowa
21st-century American poets
21st-century American male writers